Amund Rasmussen Skarholt (31 March 1892  –  28 April 1956) was a Norwegian politician for the Norwegian Labour Party.

He was born in Orkdal.

He was elected to the Norwegian Parliament from Sør-Trøndelag in 1934, and was re-elected on four occasions. During his fifth term, he died. He was then replaced by Jenny Lund.

Skarholt was a member of Orkdal municipality council between 1919 and 1951. He served most of this time as a member of the executive committee.

References

1892 births
1956 deaths
Labour Party (Norway) politicians
Members of the Storting
20th-century Norwegian politicians